Buffalo River Dene Nation 193 is an Indian reserve of the Buffalo River Dene Nation in Saskatchewan. It is 84 kilometres northwest of Île-à-la-Crosse. In the 2016 Canadian Census, it recorded a population of 783 living in 233 of its 260 total private dwellings. In the same year, its Community Well-Being index was calculated at 54 of 100, compared to 58.4 for the average First Nations community and 77.5 for the average non-Indigenous community.

References

Indian reserves in Saskatchewan
Division No. 18, Saskatchewan